The Luz Station is a railway station in the Luz neighbourhood in São Paulo, Brazil. The station is part of the metropolitan rail system run by the CPTM. 

The station houses the Museum of the Portuguese Language, established in 2006.  The Luz Metro station is also located within the complex.

History
The station was built in the late 19th century with the purpose of being the headquarters of the newly founded São Paulo Railway. In the first decades of the 20th century, it was the main entrance to the city, a fact that gave it a major economic relevance, because the majority of the coffee from Santos was delivered in the station, along with the imported supplies.

The current building was finished in 1901. The materials for its construction were brought from UK. The station was designed and produced by Walter Macfarlane & Co. Saracen Foundry, Glasgow. The station was assembled in Glasgow, then disassembled and sent to São Paulo where it was reassembled. The building was designed by the British architect Henry Driver.

Fire
 In 1946, the station caught fire and during the rebuilding process, a new floor was added to the building. Since then, the rail transport in Brazil started to decline, the same happened with the Luz neighbourhood. Both factors led to the degradation of the station. However, in the 1990s, the station was repaired.
 On December 21, 2015, the station suffered a major fire that started at the Museum of the Portuguese Language. The fire devastated the station's major building, and claimed one firefighter life.

Cultural influence

The station is a remnant from the period when the coffee was a major source of income to the city. For decades, the station tower dominated the city's skyline and its clock was the reference to the other clocks in São Paulo.

At its height, in the early 20th century, when the Luz neighbourhood was an important part of the city, the station was part of an architectonic block that was a major reference inside the city. The station helped to build the city's image.

With the construction of the São Paulo Metro, during the 1970s, the monument to Ramos de Azevedo, a major landmark in the nearby zones, radically changed the image of the landscape, granting, however, a greater sense of monumentality to the station.

See also

Museum of the Portuguese Language
São Paulo Railway
São Paulo Metro
Companhia Paulista de Trens Metropolitanos

References
 Jorge, Clóvis de Athayde. Luz – Notícias e reflexões. Departamento do Patrimônio Histórico. 1988
 Elias, Maria Beatriz de Campos (dir.). Um século de Luz. Editora Scipione. 2001
 Toledo, Benedito Lima de. São Paulo: Três cidades em um século. Editora Cosac e Naify. 2003.

Companhia Paulista de Trens Metropolitanos stations
Railway stations in São Paulo
Railway stations opened in 1901
Tourist attractions in São Paulo
Charles Henry Driver buildings
National heritage sites of São Paulo (state)
2015 disasters in Brazil
2015 fires in South America
Museum fires
Demolished buildings and structures in Brazil
Fires in Brazil
Museums in Brazil
Burned buildings and structures in Brazil